Sabzevar, previously known as Beyhagh (also spelled "Beihagh"), is a city and capital of Sabzevar County, in Razavi Khorasan Province, approximately  west of the provincial capital Mashhad, in northeastern Iran. At the 2006 census, its population was 208,172, in 57,024 families.

Sabzevar is the commercial center for an agricultural region producing grapes and raisins. There is some small-scale industry, for food processing, copperware, and electric motors. Through the old bazaar of Sabzevar fresh, dried, and preserved fruits and vegetables are exported. Sabzevar is connected to Tehran and Mashhad by road.  Sabzevar Airport provides domestic flights.

It suffered a flash flood in April 2020.

History
The history of Sabzevar goes back to the 1st millennium BC. Ancient remains include fire-temple Azarbarzin which is still visible.
 
After the Mongol invasion of Iran, the city was the first part of Iran that moved towards its freedom, under the lead of the Sarbedaran movement.
 
In 14th century Timur invaded Iran and destroyed the city completely. Contemporary sources mention 90,000 people having been murdered by Timur. After killing all men in the town, he cut their heads and made 3 pyramids of the heads, in what is now the modern Sarberiz (meaning "Place of heads") square.
 
Sabzevar Province had been lost by the Safavids to the Uzbeks of Transoxiana, but was regained following a Safavid counter-offensive around 1600, along with Herat and Farah.

Location
Sabzevar is located in the west of Razavi Khorasan province at the northeast of Iran.

Sabzevar is a 650 km far from Tehran (the capital of Iran).

It's important close neighbors are Nishapur, Bardaskan, Esfarāyen and Shahrud.

Population 
In 1937 when Iran was ruled by Reza Shah, Sabzevar was the second most populated city in the 9th county. According to the census of 2017, Sabzevar is Iran's 34th most populous city.

Anthem
The special Anthem of Sabzevar was unveiled for the first time in 2010; it received the first rank in all anthems of cities in Razavi Khorasan province.

Main sights
Mil-e Khosrow Gerd (meaning "The brick tower of king Khosrau) is the  highest brick tower in the city. Mosques include the Masjed Jameh of Friday mosque, with its two tall minarets. They were both built during the  Islamic age of Sabzevar.

Universities
Hakim Sabzevari University is one of the most prestigious public university in Iran and the oldest university in Sabzevar. HSU was established in 1973 when its name was Kar University. After the Iran revolution in 1979, this university was halted until 1987. HSU was reestablished with a new name. The Tarbiat Moallem University of Sabzevar was working and growing until 2011. In this year this university was renamed to Hakim Sabzevari University. HSU offers 139 bachelors, masters, and Ph.D. programs to more than 9,200 male and female students studying under about 280 faculty members in 10 departments. HSU is known as the dynamic in science and the leading in development university in Iran.

Sabzevar University of Medical Sciences is one of the most prestigious public universities in Khorasan province. MEDSAB was established in 1975. In 1986, School of nursing was founded in Sabzevar. MEDSAB offers 20 programs to more than 2000 students in medical fields. This university has more than 200 faculty members. There are 5 hospitals and 4 schools in this university.

The city is home to the Islamic Azad University of Sabzevar (IAUS), founded in 1985  in response to increasing demands for a higher education center in the region;  expansion and development have always continued within the university. IAUS is one of the most private universities in Khorasan province. Currently, there are about 6,500 students studying in three campuses.

Sabzevar University of New Technology is the youngest public university in Khorasan province. SUNT was established in 2011. The main objective of this university on teaching and transferring new technology for women students. SUNT offers modern bachelors programs to more than 1000 female students studying in one department. SUNT is known as the third generation universities in Iran.

Climate 
Sabzevar has a cold semi-arid climate (Köppen climate classification: BSk).

Historical places

Notable people
Ali Shariati
Mahmoud Dowlatabadi
Hadi Sabzavari
Al-Bayhaqi
Husayn Kashifi
Abul-Fazl Bayhaqi
Ali Divandari
Ali-Akbar Furutan
Rouzbeh Cheshmi
Sayed Hassan Amin
Mohammad Khordadian
Mirza Muhammad Kamil Dehlavi
Behzad Nabavi
Mahmoud Anbarani
Abd al-A'la al-Sabzevari
Abu'l-Fadl Bayhaqi
Rezai family
Cyrus Ghani
Amir Shahi Sabzavari
Mohammad Khorramgah
Mohammad Parvin Gonabadi
Mohammad Bagher Sabzevari
Fakhreddin Hejazi
Mohammad Salari
Kulū Isfandiyār
Mohammad-Reza Rahchamani
Arash Sobhani
Ali Salehabadi
Habib Rezaei
Iraj Mehdian
Mohammadreza Davarzani
Mohammad Hashem Mirza Afsar
Hasan Reyvandi
Hedayat Hashemi
Saeed Soltampour
Hamid Sabzevari
Gholam-Ali Beski
Hossein Torabi
Hassan Lahooti
Ghasem Ghani
Hossein Golestani

Transportation 
Sabzevar is located on the country's transportation highway and passes through roads 44, 87 and the freeway under construction from shrine to shrine. Also, the Turkmenistan-Quchan-Sabzevar transit highway leads from Sabzevar to other parts of the country. It was known as the permitted air border and was operational 24 hours a day.

Airport 
Sabzevar Airport was opened in 2003 and now has international flights and is the only airport in Khorasan Razavi that transports passengers after Mashhad Airport. The airport, which had previously experienced foreign flights to Damascus and Baghdad in the 1990s and 1990s, now operates direct flights back and forth to Tehran and Kish Island two days a week.

See also

Razavi Khorasan

References

External links

 Governorship Webpage

 
Populated places in Sabzevar County
Cities in Razavi Khorasan Province